Farang (also known as Firang, Parang, and Pereng) is a village in Nilkuh Rural District in the Central District of Galikash County, Golestan Province, Iran. At the 2006 census, its population was 293, in 74 families.

References 

Populated places in Galikash County